The 2010 World Junior Figure Skating Championships was an international competition in the 2009–10 season. Commonly called "World Juniors" and "Junior Worlds", the annual event awards medals in the disciplines men's singles, ladies' singles, pair skating, and ice dancing.

The event was held between March 8 and 14, 2010 at The Uithof in The Hague, Netherlands.

Qualification
The competition was open to skaters representing ISU member nations who were at least 13 but not 19—or 21 for male pair skaters and ice dancers—before July 1, 2009 in their place of birth. National associations selected their entries according to their own criteria.

The term "Junior" in ISU competition refers to age, not skill level. Skaters may remain age-eligible for Junior Worlds even after competing nationally and internationally at the senior level. At junior events, the ISU requires that all programs conform to junior-specific rules regarding program length, jumping passes, types of elements, etc.

Number of entries per discipline
Based on the results of the 2009 World Junior Championships, the ISU allowed each country one to three entries per discipline. Countries which qualified more than one entry in a discipline:

If not listed above, one entry was allowed.

Medals table

Results

Men

Ladies

Pairs
 China did not qualify for a third spot in pairs but one was accepted wrongly and therefore the third team was disqualified.

Ice dancing

References

External links

 
 
 
 
 
 results/starting orders
 

World Junior
World Junior Figure Skating Championships
World Junior 2010
March 2010 sports events in Europe